Mastapur is a village in Rewari of Jatusana block, in the Indian state of Haryana.

Toll plaza
It has a toll plaza which employs numerous people from the village. Vehicles going from Jhajjar to Rewari or back have to pay the toll.

Adjacent villages
 Gokalgarh
 Guraora
 Bikaner
 Palhawas
 Mohdipur 
 Tehna Dipalpur, Rohrai, Karawara Manakpur

References

Villages in Rewari district